Mesorhizobium abyssinicae is a bacterium from the genus of Mesorhizobium which was isolated from root nodules of agroforestry legume trees in southern Ethiopia.

References

External links
Type strain of Mesorhizobium abyssinicae at BacDive -  the Bacterial Diversity Metadatabase	

Phyllobacteriaceae
Bacteria described in 2013